The flag of Namibia was adopted on 21 March 1990 upon independence from South Africa.

Design 
The National Symbols Sub-Committee received 870 entries for the national flag. Six designs were short-listed; this was reduced to three, those of three Namibians – Theo Jankowski of Rehoboth, Don Stevenson of Windhoek and Ortrud Clay of Lüderitz. These three designs were combined to form the Namibia national flag, adopted unanimously on 2 February 1990 by the Constituent Assembly. The three designers were publicly acknowledged  by judge Hans Berker, the chairman of the subcommittee, at the unveiling ceremony on 9 March 1990.

However, two other claims were made – South African Frederick Brownell claimed that he had designed the flag in his role as South African State Herald. The other claimant was Briton Roy Allen, who claimed that the flag design was the result of a competition run by Hannes Smith of the Windhoek Observer, and that he had won.

It is one of the few national flags incorporating a diagonal line, with other examples including the DR Congo, Tanzania, Trinidad and Tobago, and Brunei.

Colours 
The colours of the Namibian flag are described in the Government Gazette. This document also details construction of the Presidential flag. The tone or specific shade for white has not been specified.

Construction Sheet

Symbolism 
The chairman explained the symbolism of the flag's colours as follows:
 Red – represents Namibia's most important resource, its people. It refers to their heroism and their determination to build a future of equal opportunity for all.
 White – represents peace, unity, tranquility, and harmony.
 Green – symbolises vegetation and agricultural resources.
 Blue – represents the clear Namibian sky and the Atlantic Ocean, the country's precious water resources and rain.
 Golden-yellow sun – life and energy. The golden-yellow colour represents wealth of the country.
 The twelve rays of the sun – represents the twelve ethnicities of Namibia, which make up most of the Namibian population, which are divided into four main groups of three.

Description 
The flag has a white-edged red diagonal band radiating diagonally from the lower hoist-side corner. The upper triangle is blue with a gold sun with 12 triangular rays and the lower triangle is green.

In Blazon: Tierced per bend sinister Azure, and Vert, a bend sinister Gules fimbriated Argent and in dexter chief a Sun with twelve straight rays Or charged with an annulet Azure.

Other flags

Historical flags

Flags of bantustans in South West Africa 
Some of the bantustans established by South Africa during its period of administering South West Africa had adopted their own distinctive flags whilst others used the flag of South Africa.

References

External links 

World Statesmen – Namibia

Flags of Africa
Flag
Flags introduced in 1990
Flags adopted through competition
Namibia